The Almaty Cup is a tennis tournament held in Almaty, Kazakhstan since 2007. The event was part of the Association of Tennis Professionals Challenger Tour and was played on clay courts until its final edition in 2009, which was on outdoor hard courts. There were two editions in 2007.

Past finals

Singles

Doubles

External links 
ITF Search

 
ATP Challenger Tour
Hard court tennis tournaments
Tennis tournaments in Kazakhstan
Sports competitions in Almaty